Fu Xinhan (born November 27, 1984) is a Paralympian athlete from China competing mainly in category T35 sprint and  F35 throwing events.

Fu Xinhan competed in the 2004 Summer Paralympics in the shot put, he also won silvers in the F35 discus and the long jump for less severely disabled athletes in the F36-38 category.

He competed in the 2008 Summer Paralympics in Beijing, China.  There he won a silver medal in the men's 100 metres - F35 event, finished tenth in the men's Discus throw - F35/36 event and finished eighth in the men's Shot put - F35/36 event

References

External links
 

1984 births
Living people
Paralympic athletes of China
Paralympic silver medalists for China
Chinese male sprinters
Chinese male discus throwers
Chinese male long jumpers
Medalists at the 2004 Summer Paralympics
Medalists at the 2008 Summer Paralympics
Medalists at the 2012 Summer Paralympics
Paralympic medalists in athletics (track and field)
Athletes (track and field) at the 2004 Summer Paralympics
Athletes (track and field) at the 2008 Summer Paralympics
Athletes (track and field) at the 2012 Summer Paralympics
Athletes (track and field) at the 2020 Summer Paralympics
21st-century Chinese people